Stoke Hill is a large hill rising to the north of Exeter in Devon, England. It is significant as the site of both an Iron Age hill fort and a later Roman signal station.

The hill fort is situated slightly below and northeast of the Roman signal station, putting it in a better position to have sight of a number of other hill forts simultaneously.

References

Hill forts in Devon
Hills of Devon
Roman fortifications in Devon
Roman signal towers in England
Exeter